John Simson (10 October 1884 – 30 March 1976) was a Scotland international rugby union player. He played at the Wing position.

Rugby Union career

Amateur career

Simson played for Edinburgh University. He later moved to Watsonians.

Provincial career

He was capped by Edinburgh District in 1906.

International career

Simson was capped by Scotland for 7 matches.

References

1884 births
1976 deaths
Edinburgh University RFC players
Rugby union players from Edinburgh
Scotland international rugby union players
Edinburgh District (rugby union) players
Watsonians RFC players
Scottish rugby union players
Rugby union wings